Kaiserganj is an assembly constituency of the Uttar Pradesh Legislative Assembly covering the city of Kaiserganj in the Bahraich district of Uttar Pradesh, India.

Kaiserganj is one of five assembly constituencies in the Kaiserganj Lok Sabha constituency. Since 2008, this assembly constituency is numbered 288 amongst 403 constituencies.

Election results

2022

2017
Bharatiya Janta Party candidate Mukut Bihari won in 2017 Uttar Pradesh Legislative Elections defeating Bahujan Samaj Party candidate Khalid Khan by a margin of 27,363 votes.

References

External links
 

Assembly constituencies of Uttar Pradesh
Politics of Bahraich district